William Womble Harrington (October 3, 1928 – January 21, 2022) was an American pitcher in Major League Baseball who appeared in 58 games (all but two in relief) for the Philadelphia and Kansas City Athletics during the ,  and  seasons.

Harrington signed with the Athletics in 1949 and played several years of minor league baseball, winning 17, 19 and 20 games in the Class D Tobacco State League (1949), Class A Sally League (1952) and Double-A Southern Association (1958), and 115 minor league games over eleven seasons. He spent the entire 1955 campaign on the Athletics' roster and put up his best year, splitting six decisions with an earned run average of 4.11 in 34 games and 76⅔ innings pitched. During his major league career, Harrington issued 67 walks and gave up 114 hits, with 40 strikeouts in 116⅓ innings pitched. He retired from baseball after the 1961 season. Harrington died on January 21, 2022, in Garner, North Carolina.

References

External links

1928 births
2022 deaths
Major League Baseball pitchers
Kansas City Athletics players
Philadelphia Athletics players
Baseball players from North Carolina
Birmingham Barons players
Charleston Senators players
Columbus Jets players
Dallas Rangers players
Fayetteville A's players
Ottawa A's players
Red Springs Red Robins players
San Diego Padres (minor league) players
Savannah Indians players
Shreveport Sports players
Wilson Tobs players
People from Sanford, North Carolina